Achigvara or Achguara is a village in the Ochamchira District of Abkhazia, Georgia. The 2011 Abkhazian census recorded a population of 1,032 people.

History
On 12 May 2008, the Republic of Abkhazia claimed to have shot down a Georgian Hermes 450 UAV over the village, though Georgia denied the claims.

Population
The 2011 census reported a population of 1,032 in the village. There were 74 Abkhaz, 22 Armenians, 833 Georgians, 25 Mingrelians, 1 Greek, 39 Russians, 13 Ukrainians, and 26 others.

Note

References

Populated places in Ochamchira District